The 2012–13 Polish Basketball League – for sponsorship reasons Tauron Basket Liga – was the 79th season of the highest professional basketball league in Poland.

Stelmet Zielona Góra won the Polish championship, the club beat PGE Turów Zgorzelec 4–0 in the Finals.

Standings

Round 1

| rowspan=6 | Goes to Group 1

| rowspan=6 | Goes to Group 2

Round 2

Group 1–6

| rowspan=6 | Qualifies for Playoffs

Group 7–12

| rowspan=2 | Qualifies for Playoffs

Playoffs

Third place

Polish clubs in European competitions

Polish clubs in Regional competitions

References

External links
Polska Liga Koszykówki - Official Site 
Polish League at Eurobasket.com

Polish Basketball League seasons
Polish
Lea